The enzyme pseudouridylate synthase catalyzes the chemical reaction

uracil + D-ribose 5-phosphate  pseudouridine 5′-phosphate + H2O

This enzyme belongs to the family of lyases, specifically the hydro-lyases, which cleave carbon-oxygen bonds.  The systematic name of this enzyme class is uracil hydro-lyase (adding D-ribose 5-phosphate pseudouridine-5′-phosphate-forming). Other names in common use include pseudouridylic acid synthetase, pseudouridine monophosphate synthetase, 5-ribosyluracil 5-phosphate synthetase, pseudouridylate synthetase, upsilonUMP synthetase, and uracil hydro-lyase (adding D-ribose 5-phosphate).  This enzyme participates in pyrimidine metabolism.

Structural studies

References

 
 
 
 

EC 4.2.1
Enzymes of known structure